Marcos Efraín Masís Fernández (born 	August 9, 1989), known professionally as Tainy, is a Puerto Rican record producer and songwriter. Born and raised in San Juan, Puerto Rico, he entered the world of reggaeton with his work on Mas Flow 2.

Leading a new wave of Latin music for over a decade, Tainy, has been the producer of some of the biggest reggaeton hits. A repeated Grammy and BMI Award winner, Tainy has been producing for countless artists, including reggaeton pioneers like Daddy Yankee, Wisin & Yandel, Don Omar and others. Recently, he has contributed to global hits like "I Like It" by Cardi B featuring Bad Bunny and J Balvin and "No Es Justo" by Balvin featuring Zion & Lennox.

Tainy produced Oasis with Bad Bunny and Balvin, which dominated global charts and help Tainy position himself as the number one Latin producer on the Billboard charts for 27 consecutive weeks. Tainy also collaborated with Bad Bunny on the song "Callaíta" which had massive success. He released his global hit "Adicto" alongside Anuel AA and Ozuna which went on to receive multiple Platinum and Gold certification in eight countries and accumulated over 450 million streams and 550 million views on YouTube. Tainy produced the 2019 hit "China" by Anuel AA, Daddy Yankee, and Karol G featuring Ozuna and J Balvin that peaked at number one in 6 countries and reached the top 10 in nine others.

Tainy has produced songs like Lauren Jauregui's debut Latin single "Lento", "Feel It Too" featuring Jessie Reyez and Tory Lanez and Justin Bieber's "Habitual". He released his debut EP titled Neon16 Tape: The Kids That Grew Up on Reggaeton which consists of tracks with several other artists. The single "Nada" featuring Jauregui and C. Tangana was released on February 21, 2020.

Life and career

Career beginnings 
After meeting with Nely el Arma Secreta, Tainy gave Luny Tunes his demo. Luny liked the demo and signed Tainy to his team. When Tainy was 15, Nely loaned him FL Studio XXL for producing. Tainy practiced for a year until he learned. To test Tainy's potential, Luny had him work on a song. Luny ended up liking the song and used it for his album, Mas Flow 2.

Tainy and Luny produced the Los Benjamins album, producing 15 of the tracks. He has worked as a producer with Wisin & Yandel, Janet Jackson, Jennifer Lopez, Paris Hilton, Wise and many more.

NEON16 
In 2019, Tainy and music executive Lex Borrero teamed up to launch a new company called NEON16. Described as a "multifaceted talent incubator", NEON16's label side has partnered with Interscope Records and currently have on their roster Puerto Rican artist Álvaro Díaz and Colombian artist Dylan Fuentes."To create NEON16 is a dream come true. I know Lex feels the same way. It gives our team a chance to continue to build and also shift the current state of our music." - TainyBorrero said, "Our motto is 'Fear nothing, impact everything'. We want to work with talents who are willing to take creative risks in order to make a lasting impact. Tainy is the definition of our motto, he has been pushing the sounds of Latin music since the beginning of his legendary career."

Discography

Studio albums

Extended plays

Singles

Production discography 
 2005: Más Flow 2
 2005: Motivando A La Yal: Special Edition
 2005: Sangre Nueva
 2005: La Moda
 2006: Pa'l Mundo: Deluxe Edition
 2006: Top of the Line
 2006: Los Rompe Discotekas
 2006: Luny Tunes & Tainy: Mas Flow: Los Benjamins
 2006: The Bad Boy
 2006: Los Vaqueros
 2007: Luny Tunes & Tainy: Los Benjamins: La Continuación
 2007: It's My Time
 2007: Wisin vs. Yandel: Los Extraterrestres
 2007: Sangre Nueva Special Edition
 2007: The Perfect Melody
 2007: El Cartel: The Big Boss
 2007: Broke and Famous
 2008: Semblante Urbano
 2008: La Melodía de la Calle
 2008: Los Extraterrestres: Otra Dimensión
 2008: Talento de Barrio
 2008: Luny Tunes Presents: Erre XI
 2008: Masacre Musical
 2008: El Fenómeno
 2009: Down to Earth
 2009: Welcome to the Jungle
 2009: La Revolución
 2009: The Last
 2009: The Black Frequency - Los Yetzons
 2009: La Melodia De La Calle: Updated
 2009: La Evolución
 2010: My World
 2010: El Momento
 2010: Drama Queen
 2010: Los Verdaderos
 2011: Los Vaqueros 2: El Regreso
 2011: Música + Alma + Sexo
 2011: Formula, Vol. 1
 2012: Líderes
 2012: La Fórmula
 2013: Los Sucesores - J King & Maximan
 2013: Geezy Boyz - De La Ghetto
 2013: De Líder a Leyenda
 2013: Sentimiento, Elegancia & Maldad
 2014: Legacy
 2014: El Regreso del Sobreviviente
 2014: Love & Sex
 2015: Legacy: De Líder a Leyenda Tour (EP)
 2015:  La Melodía de la Calle: 3rd Season
 2015: The Last Don, Vol. 2
 2015: La Artilleria Vol. 1 
 2015: Dangerous
 2015: Revolucionario
 2016: Alto Rango
 2017: Update
 2018: X 100pre
 2019: Hurt by You
 2019: Oasis
 2020: The Kids That Grew Up on Reggaeton
 2020: YHLQMDLG
 2020: Emmanuel 
 2020: Sin Miedo (del Amor y Otros Demonios) 
 2021: De Una Vez
 2021: Baila Conmigo
 2021: Los Dioses
 2021: Timelezz
 2021: Las Leyendas Nunca Mueren
 2022: Motomami
 2022: Un Verano Sin Ti

Awards 
He has received three Broadcast Music, Inc. (BMI) Awards, which are annually awarded to songwriters, composers and music publishers of the year's most-performed songs in the BMI catalog, for Wisin & Yandel's "Abusadora" and "Pam Pam" and Ivy Queen's "La Vida Es Así".

Latin Grammy Awards

Spotify Awards

Premios Lo Nuestro

Notes

References 

1989 births
Juno Award for R&B/Soul Recording of the Year winners
Latin Grammy Award winners
Latin music songwriters
Living people
People from San Juan, Puerto Rico
Puerto Rican reggaeton musicians
Reggaeton record producers